Brassavola tuberculata is a species of orchid native to Bolivia, Paraguay and Brazil.

Its diploid chromosome number has been determined as 2n = 40; its haploid chromosome number has been determined as n = 20.

References

tuberculata
Orchids of Brazil
Plants described in 1829